"The Fifth Stage" is the eleventh episode and mid-season finale of the fourth season of the NBC superhero drama series Heroes and seventieth episode overall. The episode aired on November 30, 2009.

Plot 
As Noah Bennet goes over what he knows already about the carnival people, he is surprised by Lauren who decided to take him out on a date to the movies instead of the other way around.

Angela Petrelli meets with Peter Petrelli, informing him he must move to the "fifth stage" and accept that Nathan Petrelli is dead.

Peter then uses the Haitian's other ability to suppress Sylar's mind deep down, allowing Nathan to resurface.

Critical reception
Steve Heisler of The A.V. Club rated this episode a C+.

Robert Canning of IGN gave the episode 7.4 out of 10.

References

External links

Heroes (season 4) episodes
2009 American television episodes